Akhil Arvind Herwadkar (born 31 October 1994) is a cricketer who plays as an All-rounder opening batsman for the Chhattisgarh. Herwadkar is a left-hand batsman and offbreak bowler. He has played for Mumbai Under-19s. He was a member of the Indian Under-19 World Cup squads of 2012 and 2014.

Herwadkar was born in Sangli. He hails from a small town Jaysingpur near Sangli. He came to a training camp in Pune as an 11-year-old. He made his first-class debut for Mumbai, at the age of 17, on 29 November 2011 against Orissa and scored 11 runs in that match.

References

External links 
 
 

Indian cricketers
Mumbai cricketers
Living people
1994 births
People from Sangli
Delhi Capitals cricketers